The 548th Grenadier Division was a German infantry division during World War II.

History 
The division was formed in Lithuania on 11 July 1944 and fought on the Eastern Front as part of the XII SS Corps.
 
On 9 October 1944, the division was renamed the 548th Volksgrenadier Division.

The division fought in the Battle of Memel, in East Prussia and was destroyed during the Samland offensive in the Pillau–Königsberg area in February/March 1945.

Commanders 
Generalmajor Erich Sudau (11 July 1944 – 9 April 1945), killed in the Battle of Königsberg.

Source 
 Lexikon der Wehrmacht
 Axis History 

Military units and formations established in 1944
1*548
Military units and formations disestablished in 1945